Oswaldo Raúl Baca Carbo (June 29, 1931 – May 7, 2014) was an Ecuadorian engineer and politician. He is thought to be a historic leader of the Democratic Party of Ecuador. He was one of the most influential figures in Ecuadorian politics.

He was President of the National Congress on three separate occasions, in addition to being president of the Andean Parliament and the Latin American Parliament.

Baca was born in Quito, Ecuador. He died in Quito, Ecuador, aged 82.

References

1931 births
2014 deaths
Presidents of the National Congress (Ecuador)
People from Quito
Democratic Left (Ecuador) politicians